Antonio Zucchelli (March 8, 1663 – July 13, 1716) was an Italian Franciscan Capuchin friar, explorer and missionary. He is best known for his missionary work in the Kingdom of Kongo. In 1712 he published memoirs of his life in the Kongo.

Memoirs
Antonio Zucchelli's memoirs include 23 reports. In them, he talked about his work and his travels, visiting the Kingdom of Kongo, Geona, Malaga, Cadiz, Lisbon, Brazil, the Kingdom of Angola, Malta, and Venice.

References

External links 
 

1663 births
1716 deaths
Capuchin missionaries
Italian explorers
Italian Roman Catholic missionaries
Roman Catholic missionaries in the Republic of the Congo
Roman Catholic missionaries in Angola
Italian expatriates in the Republic of the Congo
Italian expatriates in Angola